Excelsior Mountain is the 21st-highest mountain in Yosemite National Park, on the northeastern border of Yosemite. It is the next high peak, north of Mount Conness. Excelsior Mountain is mostly made of rust-colored metamorphic rock, similar to Mount Dana, which is also close.

Near to Excelsior Mountain

All of the following are near to Excelsior Mountain:

References

External links and references

 A topographic map, of Excelsior Mountain area
 Another topo map
 One hike, up Excelsior Mountain

Mountains of Yosemite National Park
Mountains of Mono County, California
Mountains of Tuolumne County, California